The FA Cup 1958–59 is the 78th season of the world's oldest football knockout competition; The Football Association Challenge Cup, or FA Cup for short. The large number of clubs entering the tournament from lower down the English football league system meant that the competition started with a number of preliminary and qualifying rounds. The 30 victorious teams from the Fourth Round Qualifying progressed to the First Round Proper.

Preliminary round

Ties

Replays

1st qualifying round

Ties

Replays

2nd replay

2nd qualifying round

Ties

Replays

3rd qualifying round

Ties

Replays

2nd replay

4th qualifying round
The teams that given byes to this round are Bishop Auckland, Wycombe Wanderers, Bedford Town, Peterborough United, Wigan Athletic, Yeovil Town, Hereford United, South Shields, Walthamstow Avenue, Weymouth, Rhyl, Blyth Spartans, Hastings United, Guildford City, Newport I O W, Scarborough, Dorchester Town, Goole Town, Margate, Chelmsford City, Worcester City, Bath City, Crook Town and Durham City.

Ties

Replays

1958–59 FA Cup
See 1958-59 FA Cup for details of the rounds from the First Round Proper onwards.

External links
 Football Club History Database: FA Cup 1958–59
 FA Cup Past Results

Qualifying
FA Cup qualifying rounds